Jenny Cuffe is a freelance and BBC journalist.

Education
She studied English literature at Newnham College and Cambridge University, before embarking upon a career as a print and radio journalist. She currently lives in Winchester, Hampshire.

Career
Jenny Cuffe joined the BBC in 1974 as a graduate trainee journalist. Her first position was at Radio Solent. This followed a position in local print journalism with a year at the Surrey Advertiser.

She then worked on Woman's Hour, BBC2's Public Eye and Channel 4's Despatches, as well as writing articles for the Independent newspaper and the Guardian newspaper before progressing to the BBC radio current affairs team in Manchester where she hosted the Seven Days series. She regularly produces reports for BBC File on 4 having joined it under the editorship of Helen Boaden. She also presented The Pariah Profession which received a Sony Silver award for Best News Programme of the Year in 2004.

She has interviewed prominent and often controversial public figures such as Vanessa Redgrave, Dr. Marietta Higgs and Dr. Helena Daly.

Her journalistic work has focused on certain key areas such as human rights, the rights of refugees, and the trajectory of education policy in stories such as the analysis of the Islamic Al-Islah school in Blackburn. Much of her work has focused upon contemporary politics and social issues in various parts of Africa.

In 2010 and 2011 she conducted interviews with refugees to the British Isles for the book This is my home now.

She has recently been studying on a post-graduate basis at the University of Southampton, pursuing an MA in Transnational Studies.

She has also written for other publications such as Arete magazine.

References

BBC newsreaders and journalists
Living people
Year of birth missing (living people)